Serena and Venus Williams were the defending champions, but lost in the third round to Elena Dementieva and Lina Krasnoroutskaya.

Kim Clijsters and Ai Sugiyama defeated Virginia Ruano Pascual and Paola Suárez in the final, 6–4, 6–4 to win the ladies' doubles tennis title at the 2003 Wimbledon Championships.

Seeds

  Virginia Ruano Pascual /  Paola Suárez (final)
  Kim Clijsters /  Ai Sugiyama (champions)
  Serena Williams /  Venus Williams (third round)
  Lindsay Davenport /  Lisa Raymond (semifinals)
  Cara Black /  Elena Likhovtseva (third round)
  Jelena Dokić /  Nadia Petrova (second round)
  Janette Husárová /  Conchita Martínez (quarterfinals)
  Svetlana Kuznetsova /  Martina Navratilova (quarterfinals)
  Daniela Hantuchová /  Chanda Rubin (second round)
  Liezel Huber /  Magdalena Maleeva (third round)
  Emmanuelle Gagliardi /  Meghann Shaughnessy (second round)
  Petra Mandula /  Patricia Wartusch (quarterfinals)
  Nathalie Dechy /  Émilie Loit (third round)
  Tina Križan /  Katarina Srebotnik (second round)
  Elena Dementieva /  Lina Krasnoroutskaya (semifinals)
  Janet Lee /  Wynne Prakusya (second round)

Qualifying

Draw

Finals

Top half

Section 1

Section 2

Bottom half

Section 3

Section 4

References

External links

2003 Wimbledon Championships on WTAtennis.com
2003 Wimbledon Championships – Women's draws and results at the International Tennis Federation

Women's Doubles
Wimbledon Championship by year – Women's doubles
Wimbledon Championships
Wimbledon Championships